Lodge School may refer to

The Lodge School, Barbados, a public secondary school
Lodge School (Malaysia), a private school
Lodge School (United Kingdom), the association between Commonweal Lodge, Silverdene Lodge and Downside Lodge

See also
Arnold Lodge School, Leamington Spa, Warwickshire, England